Kuramochi (written: 倉持) is a Japanese surname. Notable people with the surname include:

, Japanese baseball player
, Japanese idol, singer and actress
, Japanese manga artist
, Japanese gravure idol, television personality and actress

Japanese-language surnames